Aviv means "barley ripening", and by extension "spring season" in Hebrew. It is also used as a given name, surname, and place name, as in Tel Aviv.  The first month of the year is called the month of Aviv in the Pentateuch.  The month is called Nisan in the book of Esther, and in subsequent post-exilic history up to the present day.  These names are sometimes used interchangeably, although Aviv refers to the three month season, and Nisan is called the "first month of Aviv."

Meanings
The basic meaning of the word aviv is the stage in the growth of grain when the seeds have reached full size and are filled with starch, but have not dried yet. During the plague of hail (Exodus ), the barley was said to be [in the] aviv [stage] and the flax [in the] giv`ol. This resulted in their destruction.
The month in the Hebrew calendar when the barley has reached or passed this stage is called Aviv, or the "month of the aviv", which is the biblical lunar new year. , which is the Jewish religious new year (Rosh Hashanah (tractate) 2a). (The civil Babylonian year began with Tishrei, the seventh month, which is understood by rabbinic judaism to be the universal new year and day of judgement)  Aviv begins about the time of the Northern spring equinox (March 21). Since the Babylonian captivity, this month has mainly been called Nisan. On the “day after the Shabbat” (the 16th of the month of Nissan according to the rabbis, and the first Sunday of Passover according to the Karaites), the harvest was begun by gathering a sheaf of barley, which was offered as a sacrifice to God, when the Temple in Jerusalem existed.

Abib or Aviv may also be the same star as Spica which is the ear of grain in the constellation Virgo/Virgin/Woman.
"Aviv" in modern Hebrew accordingly also means spring, one of the four seasons. Thus the major modern Israeli city of Tel Aviv means "Spring Hill".
Since Passover is always celebrated on 15–21 (or 22 outside Israel) Nisan, near the beginning of spring, "Holiday of Aviv". Pesach or Passover is always on the 14th of Nisan. The first day of Chag ha Matzoh or the Feast of Unleavened Bread is always the day after that, the 15th of Nisan.  is an additional name for Passover.

As a name
Aviv is also a Hebrew male and female name. The old and uncommon Russian Christian male given name "" (Aviv) was possibly also borrowed from Biblical Hebrew, where it derived from the word abīb, meaning an ear or a time of year where grains come into ear, also known as "Aviv" (or Nisan—the first month of the Hebrew calendar). The feminine version of the name is Aviva. The diminutives of "Aviv" are Aviva and Viva. The patronymics derived from "Aviv" are "" (Avivovich; masculine) and "" (Avivovna; feminine).

Given name
Aviv Avraham (born 1996), Israeli footballer 
Aviv Azaria (born 1991), Israeli footballer
Aviv Geffen (born 1973), Israeli rock musician, singer, and songwriter
Avraham Aviv Alush (born 1982), Israeli actor, singer and model
Aviv Kochavi (born 1964), Israeli Chief of the General Staff
Aviv Cohen (born 1985), Israeli Engineer
Aviv Gold (born 2006), Israeli/American Intellectual

Surname
Haim Aviv (born 1940), Israeli molecular biologist
Jonathan E. Aviv (born 1960), American surgeon and professor
Juval Aviv (born 1947), Israeli-American security consultant and writer

References

External links
 Abib of God
 A look at ancient Israel and the harvest cycles as it relates to the abib barley.
 Abib (Barley) in the Hebrew Bible: a description of the importance of aviv in the Karaite calendar by the World Karaite Movement
 2011 Aviv Report (Update to that entry, showing pictures of aviv barley and how to distinguish wheat from barley): Aviv Reports added Annually
 

Hebrew calendar
Hebrew words and phrases
Hebrew masculine given names
Russian masculine given names